Morozovo is a rural locality (a selo) and the administrative center of Morozovskoye Rural Settlement, Verkhovazhsky District, Vologda Oblast, Russia. The population was 158 as of 2002. There are 6 streets.

Geography 
Morozovo is located 26 km northwest of Verkhovazhye (the district's administrative centre) by road. Silinskaya-1 is the nearest rural locality.

References 

Rural localities in Verkhovazhsky District